Million standard cubic feet per day  is a unit of measurement for gases that is predominantly used in the United States. It is frequently abbreviated MMSCFD. MMSCFD is commonly used as a measure of natural gas, liquefied petroleum gas, compressed natural gas and other gases that are extracted, processed or transported in large quantities. 

A related measure is "mega standard cubic metres per day" (MSm3/d), which is equal to 106 Sm3/d used in many countries outside the United States. One MMSCFD equals 1177.6 Sm3/h.

When converting to mass flowrate, the density of the gas should be used at Standard temperature and pressure.

See also
SCFM
Standard cubic foot

External links
 checalc.com Gas Volume Conversion
 onlineflow.de Online calculator for conversion of volume, mass and molar flows (SCFM, MMSCFD, Nm3/hr, kg/s, kmol/hr and more)

References

Units of flow